Taf may refer to:
 River Taf, in South Wales, UK
 Tav/Taf/Taph/Taw, the final letter of many Semitic alphabets
 Modern Greek pronunciation of the letter Tau

Acronym 
The acronym TAF may refer to:

Film and television 
The American Friend, 1977 film
Thomas And Friends (titled Thomas the Tank Engine & Friends prior to 2003), a British television series based on The Railway Series of books by the Reverend Wilbert Awdry and his son, Christopher Awdry.

Medicine and related fields 
 TBP-associated factors, a term used in genetics
 Tenofovir alafenamide fumarate, a drug use in the treatment of HIV infection
 Trim and Fit, a former school anti-obesity program in Singapore

Military organisations 
 Tactical air force, a formation of the air forces of the British Commonwealth during and after World War II:
 Australian First Tactical Air Force - South West Pacific Area
 Desert Air Force (later known as the First Tactical Air Force) - North Africa and later Italy
 RAF Second Tactical Air Force - Northern Europe
 RAF Third Tactical Air Force - South Asia
 Northwest African Tactical Air Force
 Territorial Air Force, the reserve Air Force of New Zealand
 Tunisian Armed Forces
 Tunisian Air Force
 Turkish Armed Forces
 Turkish Air Force

Non-military organisations 
 TAF Linhas Aéreas, a former Brazilian airline
 Taiwan Accreditation Foundation, an organization in Taipei, Taiwan
 Taiwanese American Foundation, an organization working in the Taiwanese immigrant community of the US
 The Asia Foundation, a non-profit organization operating in Asia
 The Athlete's Foot, a retail supplier of shoes and other sports apparel
 Tiger Athletic Foundation, private, non-profit corporation supporting Louisiana State University and its athletics program
 Trade Association Forum, an umbrella group for trade organisations in the UK

Other uses 
 Telecom Animation Film, an animation studio in Japan
 Term Auction Facility, an instrument of monetary policy introduced in US financial markets
 Terminal aerodrome forecast, format for reporting weather forecast information in aviation
 Test automation framework, in computer software testing
 Thousand acre-feet, a unit of volume
 Tokyo International Anime Fair, an anime trade fair held annually in Japan
 Treno ad alta frequentazione, an Italian railway vehicle